10th FAI World Rally Flying Championship took place between September 14–21, 1997 in Antalya, Turkey, as a part of the 1st World Air Games.

Competitors
There were 82 crews from Poland (5), South Africa (5), Germany (5), Austria (5), Chile (5), Greece (5), Czech Republic (4), Slovakia (4), Hungary (4), Turkey (4), United States (3), France (3), Croatia (3), Italy (3), Russia (3), United Kingdom (2), Spain (2), Republic of Macedonia (2), Cyprus (2), Brazil (2), Switzerland (1), Lithuania (1), New Zealand (1), Slovenia (1), Denmark (1), the Netherlands (1), Luxembourg (1), Mozambique (1), Indonesia (1) (there are no details given as for two crews).

Contest
First navigation competition results:
 Krzysztof Wieczorek / Wacław Wieczorek  - 54 points (penal)
 Janusz Darocha / Zbigniew Chrząszcz  - 64 pts
 Jiři Jakes / Lubomir Šťovíček  - 80 pts
 Włodzimierz Skalik / Ryszard Michalski  - 84 pts
 Marek Kachaniak / Sławomir Własiuk  - 160 pts

Second navigation competition results:
 Marek Kachaniak / Sławomir Własiuk  - 62 pts
 Jiři Jakes / Lubomir Šťovíček  - 88 pts
 Kazda / Stastny  - 115 pts
 Dariusz Zawłocki / Jerzy Markiewicz  - 133 pts
 Włodzimierz Skalik / Ryszard Michalski  - 180 pts

Third navigation competition results:
 Krzysztof Wieczorek / Wacław Wieczorek  - 84 pts
 František Cihlář / Petr Toužimský  - 168 pts
 Włodzimierz Skalik / Ryszard Michalski  - 180 pts
 Philippe Odeon / Girault  - 245 pts
 Marek Kachaniak / Sławomir Własiuk  - 247 pts

Results

Individual (10 best) 

Note: crews from the 1st, 2nd and 7th places apparently were taken into account with a result of only one (worst) competition.

Team
Two best crews were counted

  - 634 pkt
  - 1159
  - 2341
  - 2366
  - 2661
  - 2898
  - 3808
  - 4099
  - 4286
  - 4369
  - 5948
  - 6048
  - 6843
  - 7364
  - 9057
  - 9135
  - 9978
  - 11474
  - 13035
  - 14628

External links
 10th FAI World Rally Flying Championship (source for the page)

See also
 9th FAI World Rally Flying Championship
 11th FAI World Rally Flying Championship

Rally Flying 10
1997 FAI World Flying Championship
Rally Flying
1997 in Turkish sport
Fédération Aéronautique Internationale
September 1997 sports events in Turkey
Aviation history of Turkey